There are fourteen historical Zünfte (guilds, singular Zunft) of Zürich, under the system established in 1336 with the "guild revolution" of Rudolf Brun. They are the 13 guilds that predated 1336, plus the Gesellschaft zur Constaffel, originally consisting of the city's nobles.

Guilds founded in 1336 
There have been two mergers of historical guilds since, so that there are 12 contemporary Zünfte continuing the medieval guilds:

19th century guilds 
In the 19th century, with the expansion of Zürich, incorporating various formerly separate villages, a number of new "guilds" were established to represent these. By this time the old guilds had ceased to be tied to specific trades and had acquired a mostly folkloristic and societal function, uniting the upper strata of old and well-to-do clans of Zürich.

See also 
Sechseläuten
History of Zürich
Gesellschaft zu Fraumünster

References

External links 

 sächsilüüte.ch: Zentralkomitee der Zünfte Zürichs 

History of Zürich
Guilds in Switzerland